Karachi Development Authority (KDA) was established as the city-planning authority of Karachi in 1957, and replaced the earlier Karachi Improvement Trust (KIT). KDA, along with the Lyari Development Authority and Malir Development Authority, is responsible for the development of undeveloped lands around Karachi. KDA came under the control of Karachi's local government and mayor in 2001, but was later placed under direct control of the Government of Sindh in 2011. City-planning in Karachi, therefore, is devised at the provincial rather than local level.

History 
"The Karachi Development Authority was successor of Karachi Improvement Trust and launched its first scheme at the junction of National Stadium & Karsaz in front of Agha Khan Hospital, Liaquat National Hospital & Liaquat Memorial Library known as Dhoraji Colony KDA Scheme 1-A. This area is considered to be the most posh area of the city of Karachi, having houses of the rich and wealthy. The area is also very expensive."

A municipal commission was established in 1852 to provide city-planning services in Karachi's residential zones - cantonment areas came under control of military administration rather can civic administration. In 1934, the city of Karachi Municipal Act was passed, which lead to the formation of the Karachi Municipal Corporation (KMC) that was responsible for development and maintenance of the city. After independence in 1947, KMC was superseded by the Karachi Improvement Trust (KIT), which was created to help manage the city after the influx of hundreds of thousands of refugees from India. KIT developed the first master plan for the city after independence, in conjunction with the Swedish firm Merz Randal Vetten (MRV). 

The Karachi Development Authority was established by the order No V of 1957 signed by President of Pakistan General Muhammad Ayub Khan for development and expansion of Karachi. The Karachi Municipal Corporation, on the hand, was tasked with maintenance of the already-developed parts of the city. KDA was given a large portion of land, and was directly responsible for its development. The KDA, however, did not have control over federally-administered areas, such as cantonments or railway land.

The Karachi Development Authority was successor of Karachi Improvement Trust and launched its first scheme at the junction of National Stadium & Karsaz, known as Dhoraji Colony KDA Scheme 1-A. After improvement & development of its Scheme 1-A, KDA launched a "town expansion scheme" for Korangi Township, followed by Malir Town, Drigh Township, Malir Extension Township, Drigh Township, North Karachi Township, Old Nazimabad, North Nazimabad, Orangi Township, Baldia Township, Lyari Town, Hawksbay, Shah Latif, Mehran Town, Halkani Town, Landhi Industrial Area, Landhi Residential Scheme, Metroville-I to III, Gulzar-e-Hijri, Gulshan-e-Iqbal, Gulistan-e-Jauhar, Taiser Town, Korangi Industrial Area, and SITE Metroville. KDA also undertook civil engineering improvement schemes, such as Karachi Greater water channel scheme, Malir River Flood Protection Bund, among other. KDA is also responsible for approving master plans for private housing societies within the territorial limit of Karachi City.

In 1993 and 1994, the Lyari Development Authority (LDA) and Malir Development Authority (MDA) were established.

In 2001 under the rule of General Pervez Musharaf, the KDA, LDA, MDA, and KMC were devolved to Karachi's local administration under the control of Mayor Syed Mustafa Kamal as part of the now-defunct City District Government Karachi. Kamal earned international accolade for his improvements to the city, and in 2010 won the World Mayor Prize for his achievements. 

Control of the KDA was removed from Karachi's local government in 2011, and was handed back to the provincial administration. The KMC was revived to deal with maintenance of the city, but the board only controls about 33% of Karachi's urbanized area - with the remainder under the control of the federal or provincial government. The LDA and MDA were also revived by the Pakistan Peoples Party government, in order to patronize their electoral constituencies and voting banks.

Departments

KDA Schemes
 KDA Scheme No.1 Dilkusha
 KDA Scheme No.2 Taimuria
 KDA Scheme No.3 & 4 Muzaffarabad
 KDA Scheme No.5 Kehkashan
 KDA Scheme No.7 Stadium Road
 KDA Scheme No.16 Mansura
 KDA Scheme No.24 Gulshan e Iqbal
 KDA Scheme No.33 Gulzar e Hijri
 KDA Scheme No.36 Gulistan e Johar
 KDA Scheme No.41 Surjani Town
 KDA Scheme No.45 Gulshan e Maymar

See also
 Karachi Metropolitan Corporation
Karachi Conservancy Board
 Karachi Municipal Commission
 Karachi Municipal Committee
 City District Government of Karachi
Government of Karachi
Mayor of Karachi
Commissioner Karachi
Administrator of Karachi
Malir Development Authority
Lyari Development Authority

References

External links
 KDA Official site

Government of Karachi
1957 establishments in Pakistan
Urban development authorities
Government agencies of Sindh